James Horsewell or Horswell (by 1496 – 1544/46) was Mayor and MP of Plymouth, England.

He was a municipal official with posts in the admiralty court and the customs of Plymouth and served as Mayor of the town in 1528–29, 1535–36 and 1542–43.

He was elected MP for Plymouth in 1539 and 1542.

References

Year of birth uncertain
1540s deaths
Members of the Parliament of England for Plymouth
Mayors of Plymouth
English MPs 1539–1540
English MPs 1542–1544